Viktor Aleksandrovich Maslov (April 27, 1910 in Moscow – May 11, 1977) was a Soviet Russian footballer and coach. He was especially notable during his coaching career. He won numerous USSR Championships with clubs Torpedo Moscow, Dynamo Kyiv, and one with FC Ararat Yerevan. The second best coach in history of Dynamo Kyiv after Valeriy Lobanovsky.

Career 
He is often seen as being one of the most innovative and influential football managers of all time. He was the first to experiment with players' nutrition, and invented the 4-4-2 formation, along with the notion of pressing, which, in the words of  Jonathan Wilson "may be seen as the birth of modern football". Wilson credits Maslov as one of the progenitors of the pressing game. This was a key development, as before Maslov, teams tended to allow their opponents more time on the ball, whereas Maslov's strategy of pressing denied players this time and space, and led to the game based more on speed and fitness that is common across the top European and South American leagues today.

References 

Soviet footballers
Soviet football managers
1910 births
1977 deaths
Footballers from Moscow
FC Torpedo Moscow managers
FC Zimbru Chișinău managers
FC SKA Rostov-on-Don managers
FC Dynamo Kyiv managers
FC Ararat Yerevan managers
Merited Coaches of the Soviet Union
Merited Coaches of Ukraine
FC Torpedo NN Nizhny Novgorod players
Association football midfielders
FC Torpedo Moscow players